, also known as , is a Japanese company run by Hobonichi Co., Ltd. that designs and produces various daily life products such as T-shirts and notebooks. The company was founded by copywriter Shigesato Itoi (a.k.a. "Darling") on June 6, 1998, and it was originally his idea to call the site "Almost Daily" to give it more leeway, as he thought that daily updates would be too much mental pressure and content-wise, but since the site's launch at midnight (Bali time), some content has been updated every day. Originally started as Itoi's personal website, it has grown into one of the most profitable websites in Japan by focusing on sales of goods. In 2012, the website won the Porter Prize.

The site currently receives about 1.5 million page views a day, making it the largest personal website in Japan. Annual sales reached 3 billion yen in 2014, despite the fact that the company has not sold any membership-based paid content or advertising space to date.

Content

Today's Darling
A "sort of essay" written daily by Itoi himself that can be found on the top page. Since the opening of the site, he has continued to write every day without a break. One of the main features of the site is that the past essays written so far are not archived, and if they are not read that day, the data will be updated the next day. However, books containing past essays, etc. are available for purchase.

Interviews
Itoi invites guests for conversations, and is visited by people from diverse industries. Some examples of people who have appeared in the past include: Sanma Akashiya, Hiroshi Aramata, Ichiro Suzuki, Hiromi Kawakami, Ryuichi Sakamoto, Momoko Sakura, Kinichi Hagimoto, Toshio Suzuki, Shuntarō Tanikawa, Tamori, Shōfukutei Tsurube II, Eikichi Yazawa, Hitoshi Matsumoto, Tatsunori Hara, Kiyoshi Nakahata, So Taguchi, Dai Tamesue, etc.

Sale of goods
The company develops and sells a wide range of merchandise in cooperation with major manufacturers, including T-shirts, calendars, bound notebooks, and clay pots. This is Hobonichi's main source of revenue. In particular, the original bound notebooks called Hobonichi Techo have become popular goods that have been perfected with the input of users since the early days of the site, and are still being sold as "evolving notebooks" with improvements made every year. In addition, a number of books born from the site's content have been published, and even a Hobonichi Credit Card was issued in cooperation with DC Card (currently no longer being issued). In addition, the company has collaborated with Nissin Foods and 7-Eleven to produce and sell an official Hobonichi cup noodle called .

Treetop Secret Base
Hobonichi has a close relationship with Nintendo due to its connection with Itoi's MOTHER series of games, and has been running a series of articles on Nintendo called  since its establishment. In 2006, Nintendo gave priority to providing information on Mother 3 to Hobonichi, and Hobonichi staff members were in charge of the pages on Nintendo's homepage.

In addition, the former president of Nintendo, Satoru Iwata, had a personal relationship with Itoi and held the title of "IT manager" at Hobonichi since its inception, and in 2007 was still the IT manager for the site despite also leading Nintendo. This was due to Iwata's great personal efforts as a partner in launching the website and making it online within Itoi's office (Iwata was working at HAL Laboratory when the website was launched). Conversations with Iwata and Shigeru Miyamoto were also held on a regular basis.

Events
In addition to the development on the website, various events were also managed. Major events include a rakugo performance Kesennuma Samma Yose with Shinosuke Tatekawa, a baseball game at Tokyo Dome, and Hatarakitai Exhibition, a commemorative event for the 15th anniversary of the site's launch. The exhibition was held at Parco Museum in Shibuya from June 6 to 17, 2013, at Umeda Loft from December 28, 2013 to January 19, 2014, and at Fukuoka Parco from April 25 to May 11, 2014. In addition, Seikatsu no Tanoshimi Exhibition, a collection of products carefully selected by Hobonichi employees, was held at Roppongi Hills in March and November 2017, at Yebisu Garden Place in June 2018, at Hankyu Umeda Main Store in October of the same year, and at Marunouchi in April 2019.

Miscellaneous
On August 2, 2014, the company opened its directly managed store and gallery (event space), TOBICHI, near its headquarters, followed by its annex, TOBICHI 2, on February 22, 2015, and its western Japan base in Kyoto ("TOBICHI Kyoto") on June 6, 2017.

References

External links

 
 
 
  
 
 

Manufacturing companies of Japan
Nintendo
Japanese brands
Japanese companies established in 1998
Manufacturing companies established in 1998